Bangarada Mane (Kannada: ಬಂಗಾರದ ಮನೆ) is a 1996 Indian Kannada film, directed by H. R. Bhargava and produced by Bharathi Devi. The film stars Devaraj, Sithara, Hema and Dheerendra Gopal in lead roles. The film had musical score by Rajan–Nagendra.

Cast

Devaraj
Kashinath in special appearance
Sithara
Hema Panchamukhi 
Dheerendra Gopal
M. S. Umesh
Shivakumar
Aravind
Kaushik
Naveen
Siddartha
Nagesh Mayya
Disco Shanthi
Padma Vasanthi
Ashalatha
Bhavyashree Rai
Nayana
Prema
Sampreetha
Kunigal Nagabhushan
Shani Mahadevappa
M. S. Karanth
Premraj

Soundtrack

The film score and the soundtrack were composed by Rajan–Nagendra.

References

External links
 

1996 films
1990s Kannada-language films
Films scored by Rajan–Nagendra
Films directed by H. R. Bhargava